Abraham Thomas may refer to:
 Abraham Thomas (surgeon), Indian plastic surgeon
 Abraham Garrod Thomas, Welsh physician and politician
 Abraham Thomas (mass murderer), United States Army soldier and mass murderer